Khowai is one of the 60 Legislative Assembly constituencies of Tripura state in India. It is in Khowai district and is a part of East Tripura Lok Sabha constituency.

Members of Legislative Assembly

 1967: S. C. Datta, Indian National Congress
 1972: Jadu Prasanna Bhattacharjee, Indian National Congress
 1977: Swaraijam Kamini Thakur Singha, Communist Party of India (Marxist)
 1983: Samir Deb Sarkar, Communist Party of India (Marxist)
 1988: Arun Kumar Kar, Indian National Congress
 1993: Samir Deb Sarkar, Communist Party of India (Marxist)
 1998: Samir Deb Sarkar, Communist Party of India (Marxist)
 2003: Samir Deb Sarkar, Communist Party of India (Marxist)
 2008: Samir Deb Sarkar, Communist Party of India (Marxist)
 2013: Biswajit Datta, Communist Party of India (Marxist)
 2018: Nirmal Biswas, Communist Party of India (Marxist)

 2023: Nirmal Biswas, Communist Party of India (Marxist)

Election results

2023

See also
List of constituencies of the Tripura Legislative Assembly
 Khowai district
 Khowai
 Tripura East (Lok Sabha constituency)
 2023 Tripura Legislative Assembly election

References

Khowai district
Assembly constituencies of Tripura